Cowcumbala, New South Wales is a rural locality and civil parish of Harden County, New South Wales.

The  parish of Cowcumbala is located at 34°43'54.0"S 148°04'04.0"E on the Main Southern railway line, New South Wales. The nearest town is Cootamundra to the north. Cowcumbala is on the traditional lands of the Wiradjuri people.

References

Localities in New South Wales
Geography of New South Wales